KAZG (1440 AM) is a radio station broadcasting an oldies format. Licensed to Scottsdale, Arizona, United States, the station covers the Phoenix metropolitan area. KAZG is owned by Hubbard Broadcasting, Inc. and licensed to Phoenix FCC License Sub, LLC.  The station's studios are located in North 52nd Street west of Papago Park and its AM transmitter is in Scottsdale. KAZG can also be heard on 92.7 FM via an FM translator and brands itself as "Oldies 92.7."

Call letters
KAZG signed on in 1956 as KPOK ("Cowpoke") in Scottsdale. Like many stations in the Phoenix area at the time, it originally ran a country-music format. KPOK became KWBY in 1961.

Beginning in 1964, AM 1440 was known as KDOT; it aired an adult-standards format until 1976, when it changed calls to KSGR ("K-Sugar") to fit an oldies format. This lasted until 1978 when it became KOPA. Beginning in the 1960s, it simulcasted on FM 100.7, which continued under various formats and call letters until the mid-1990s.

The station was assigned the call letters KOPA on April 24, 1978. On September 1, 1980, the station changed its call sign to KXAM, and adopted an urban format. On March 25, 1982, they reverted to KOPA, then on February 19, 1996, to KSLX, and on April 1, 2001, to the current KAZG. For about a year in the mid-1990s, the format was CNN Headline News.

Programming
KAZG currently programs an automated format of oldies from the 1960s and 1970s. Occasionally, the station will play only 1960's music during "Super 60s Weekends" or only 1970's music during "Super 70s Weekends".

In 2018, Steve Goddard, a well-known local radio host, became the afternoon host for KAZG, bringing his two nationally syndicated radio shows, "The 70's with Steve Goddard" and "Goddard's Gold", with him. In 2021, KAZG began playing The Star-Spangled Banner every weekday at noon.

Steve Goddard's local radio show can be heard every weekday from 3PM-7PM, "The 70's with Steve Goddard" can be heard every Saturday morning from 7AM-10AM, and "Goddard's Gold" can be heard every Sunday morning from 9AM-12PM.

Transmitter 
KAZG is popularly referred to as "The Lumberyard" or "Lumberyard 1440" due to the location of its transmitter, directly behind an actual lumber yard at the corner of 64th Street and Thomas Road in south Scottsdale. From this intersection, the transmitter building is accessible via a dirt path bordering the eastern side of the Salt River Project's Crosscut Canal.

The station transmits at 5,000 watts daytime, and is thus listenable throughout much of the Phoenix metro area.  It has a single-tower, non-directional antenna.

Since AM 1440 was originally licensed as an AM daytimer before the Federal Communications Commission (FCC) abolished the designation, it had been required to turn off its transmitter at local sundown, and allowed to turn it back on at local sunrise. Although KAZG was now licensed by the FCC to transmit at 52 watts of power at night, former owner Sandusky Radio usually opted to turn off the transmitter, apparently to avoid the electricity expense of transmitting at such an unusable power level.  On rare occasions, such as when it carried Arizona State baseball or University of Arizona football as an "overflow" station of KDUS, the station would switch to its nighttime power.

Radio observers liked to refer to the station's regulator of sunrise/sunset power switches as the "lamp timer," since the times of switching were irregular and tended to drift away from FCC specifications over time, as if the switches were driven by a cheap mechanical lamp timer.

In March 2012, KAZG began transmitting at its fully licensed 52 watts of power during nighttime hours, becoming a 24/7 station for the first time in its history. When the Sandusky Radio stations were purchased by Hubbard in 2013, this practice continued.

On January 25, 2016, KAZG rebranded as "Oldies 92.7" (the 92.7 in the branding is for FM translator K224CJ 92.7 FM Phoenix). K224CJ had been independently owned and had simulcast several stations in its history. It was not until 2017 that Hubbard bought the translator for $1.8 million, setting a record for the highest sale price ever commanded by an FM translator.

References

External links

AZG
Radio stations established in 1978
Oldies radio stations in the United States
Hubbard Broadcasting